Ronnie Davis (born 10 August 1942) is a retired English professional darts player who played in British Darts Organisation events in the 1970s and 1980s.

Career
Davis won the 1978 Winmau World Masters, beating Keith Harvey, Colin Baker and Cliff Lazarenko before beating Tony Brown in the final. Davis then played in the 1979 BDO World Darts Championship, beating Tony Sontag in the first round before losing in the second round to Alan Evans.

World Championship results

BDO
 1979: Last 16: (lost to Alan Evans 0–2) (sets)

External links
Profile and stats on Darts Database

Living people
English darts players
British Darts Organisation players
1942 births